Yingshanosaurus (meaning "Yingshan or Golden Hills reptile") is a genus of stegosaurian dinosaur from the Late Jurassic, around 155 million years ago. It was a herbivore that lived in what is now China. The type species is Yingshanosaurus jichuanensis.

Discovery and naming
In 1983, a stegosaurian skeleton was excavated in Sichuan by a team led by Wan Jihou. In 1984, the find was reported by Zhou Shiwu. In 1985, Zhou used the name Yingshanosaurus jichuanensis during a paleontological congress in Toulouse. Though his lecture was published in 1986, it was assumed that the name remained a nomen nudum due to an insufficient description. In 1994 however, Zhu Songlin fully described the animal. This fact escaped most Western researchers who considered the taxon invalid until well into the twenty-first century. The generic name is derived from the county of Yingshan. The specific name refers to the location of the site, Sichuan.

The holotype, CV OO722, was found in a layer of the late Upper Shaximiao Formation, probably dating from the early Kimmeridgian. It consists of a partial skeleton including a fragmentary skull, of an adult individual. It contains a number of individual dorsal vertebrae, a series of dorsal vertebrae found in articulation with the sacrum and pelvis, seven tail vertebrae, ribs, seven chevrons, a left scapulocoracoid, a left humerus, a left radius, a left second metacarpal, a left thighbone, a left shinbone, a left fibula, metacarpals, a phalanx, several back plates and a left shoulder spine. The main lacking parts are the neck and the tail end. The skull bones found are so fragmentary that they provide little relevant information. A 2006 paper by Susannah Maidment states that the only fossil specimen could not be located.

Description
Like all stegosaurians, Yingshanosaurus was an herbivorous dinosaur. It was about four to five metres long. The thighbone has a length of 675 millimetres, the shinbone of forty-six centimetres. The humerus is forty centimetres long. Four vertebrae of the sacrum (S2-S5) were solidly fused to the ilia of the pelvis, the spaces between the sacral ribs being almost closed, reduced to oval depressions pierced from below by small openings, no more than a centimetre in cross-section. The neural arches are of medium height. The neural spines of the dorsal vertebrae are plate-like in side view and have a transversely expanded top.

Yingshanosaurus had a pair of about eighty centimetres long wing-like spines on its shoulders, similar in relative size to the shoulder spikes of Gigantspinosaurus. The shoulder spine has a large flat trapezoidal base; after a sudden kink, a more narrow straight shaft, flat but with a protruding ridge on the outer side, projects to behind from the lower base edge. The bony plates on its back were rather small and relatively low, triangular or fin-shaped. The largest plates, about fifteen centimetres high and with a base length of twenty centimetres, are similar in profile to those of Hesperosaurus, though of a more reduced relative size. They were not "splates", i.e. featuring a thickened middle section, but almost uniformly flat, with a rough and veined surface.

Phylogeny
Zhu placed Yingshanosaurus, within the Stegosauridae, in the Stegosaurinae.

See also

 Timeline of stegosaur research

References

External links
 "Yingshanosaurus" at the Natural History Museum

Late Jurassic dinosaurs of Asia
Stegosaurs
Fossil taxa described in 1994
Paleontology in Sichuan
Ornithischian genera